Abramenko is a Ukrainian-language surname derived form the first name Abram (Abraham).

The surname may refer to:

Evgeny Abramenko (born 1987), Belarusian biathlete
Oleksandr Abramenko (born 1988), Ukrainian freestyle skier

See also
 
9532 Abramenko, an asteroid

Ukrainian-language surnames
Patronymic surnames
Surnames from given names